= Valettia =

Scientific classification
- Domain: Eukaryota
- Kingdom: Animalia
- Phylum: Arthropoda
- Class: Malacostraca
- Order: Amphipoda
- Family: Valettidae
- Genus: Valettia; Stebbing, 1888

Genus of crustaceans

Valettia is a genus of crustaceans belonging to the monotypic family Valettidae.

The species of this genus are found in Europe.

Species:

- Valettia coheres Stebbing, 1888
- Valettia hystrix Thurston, 1989
